Véronique Girardet (born September 10, 1965 in Besançon) is a French sport shooter. She set a world record of 96 targets by winning the gold medal for women's skeet shooting at the 2005 ISSF World Championships in Lonato, Italy.

At age forty-two, Girardet made her official debut for the 2008 Summer Olympics in Beijing, where she competed in women's skeet shooting. She placed sixteenth out of nineteen shooters in the qualifying rounds of the event, with a total score of 63 points.

At the 2012 Summer Olympics in London, Girardet improved her performance from the previous games by hitting a total of 66 targets in women's skeet, finishing only in tenth place, behind Kazakhstan's Angelina Mishchuk.

Girardet is also a member of ST Castillonnaise for the shooting class, and is coached and trained by Bruno Rossetti and Antony Szewc.

References

External links
ISSF Profile
Profile – French Olympic Committee 
NBC Olympics Profile

French female sport shooters
Living people
Olympic shooters of France
Shooters at the 2008 Summer Olympics
Shooters at the 2012 Summer Olympics
Sportspeople from Besançon
1965 births